Burton and Holme railway station served the village of Burton-in-Kendal, Westmorland, England, from 1846 to 1966 on the Lancaster and Carlisle Railway.

History 
The station opened on 22 September 1846 by the Lancaster and Carlisle Railway. It closed to passengers on 25 March 1950 and to goods on 28 March 1966.

References

External links 

Disused railway stations in Cumbria
Railway stations in Great Britain opened in 1846
Railway stations in Great Britain closed in 1950
1846 establishments in England
1966 disestablishments in England
Former Lancaster and Carlisle Railway stations
Burton-in-Kendal